The women's team classification diving event at the 2017 Summer Universiade was contested from August 27 at the University of Taipei (Tianmu) Shin-hsin Hall B1 Diving Pool in Taipei, Taiwan.

Schedule 
All times are Taiwan Standard Time (UTC+08:00)

Results

References 

Diving at the 2017 Summer Universiade